The Kenya national rugby union team is also known as the Simbas (simba is Swahili for 'lion').
Kenya competes in the Africa Cup and is ranked thirty-fourth in the World Rugby Rankings as of January 2023. Kenya is yet to qualify for the Rugby World Cup.

The national team is managed by the Kenya Rugby Union. Their home ground is the RFUEA Ground which opened to an East Africa side against the British and Irish Lions in 1955.

History

Early history (1909–1960s)
Rugby Union was introduced to Kenya at the beginning of the 20th century by British settlers and the first recorded match was in 1909. The game was initially restricted to whites only.

In 1923, the primary club in Kenya, Nairobi District, was split into Nondescripts RFC and Kenya Harlequin F.C., due to the club's overwhelming strength. In the 1950s the first internationals began taking place. Early competitions included the Nairobi District Championships first held in 1925, a Royal Armed Forces tournament first held in 1937 and the Enterprise Cup which has been in existence since 1930.

Kenya played host to touring sides between the 1920s and the 1950s; notably including University of Cape Town, Stellenbosch University and a Combined Universities (Oxford and Cambridge) team at Mitchell Park Stadium in 1951.

By 1953, the Rugby Football Union of East Africa was formed to oversee rugby in the three East African colonies of Kenya, Uganda and Tanganyika. A Kenya Colony team played a Tanganyika team for the first time in 1954 and a Uganda Protectorate team in 1958 with the Kenyan representative side winning 21–11. Often, the Kenyan side was combined with other East African nations, and composed of players of European ethnicity. While the results were often lopsided, these games provided a huge amount of revenue for rugby in Kenya, and were incredibly beneficial. Kenya, as an independent side, played its first game against Tanganyika, proving to be victorious.

Independence and integration (1970s–1980s)
Post-independence, the desegregation of the Kenyan school system meant that indigenous black Africans' featured in the rugby sides of elite schools such as Duke of York and Prince of Wales. Players such as Chris Onsotti, John Gichinga, Dennis Awori, George Kariuki and Jim Owino would form the first generation of indigenous black African rugby players.

In 1972, Ted Kabetu became the first indigenous black Kenyan to play for the East Africa Tuskers in a match against Richmond RFC. That same year, the Tuskers toured Ireland, playing Irish club sides, achieving moderate success and winning 3 out of their 8 tests; Chris Onsotti became the first forward black Tusker playing at prop on the Fourth Tuskers Tour of Ireland in 1972; and Jackson "Jacko" Omaido a school boy at Lenana School (formerly Duke of York) represented the Tuskers playing at fly-half at a 1975 tour of Zambia.

An influx of players from Tanganyika due to a flight of expatriates would boost the Kenyan game. During the early 1970s, a number of English clubs began touring Kenya, playing unofficial test matches against the Tuskers. This included Harlequins RFC nearly being beaten, only for the Tuskers to lose 20–15.

After an invitation in the local dailies to black African rugby players, Miro RFC was formed as an invitational side; rather like the Barbarians or local equivalents, Scorpions RFC. Miro were an all black African side and included two white players (Doug Hamilton and Pat Orr); considered to have played an important role in bringing black Africans into rugby in Kenya. The team played Rugby Roma Olimpic in 1976, winning 20–12. However, the side was disbanded over questions of the racial selection of players.

The Tuskers, by the mid 1970s being fully integrated with both black and whites, faced Zambia, winning 4 tests out of 5. Around this time, some clubs began folding due to the flight of white expatriate players. Despite the growth, conflicts emerged between the black Kenyan players and the many clubs which were still run by expatriates; Miro RFC played again in 1979, this time recording triumph against Blackheath F.C. 32–19, providing major hope for black African rugby.

Mean Machine RFC and Mwamba RFC both founded in 1977 as indigenous African rugby sides. Mean Machine, a representative side of the University of Nairobi featuring Absalom "Bimbo" Mutere, Thomas Onyango Oketch and football international Joe "JJ" Masiga were notable for winning the Kenya Cup on their first attempt. Black Blad RFC representing Kenyatta University College would follow thereafter. Mean Machine were however disbanded as a result of the closure of Nairobi University after the failed coup of 1982.

Miro RFC continued to play, but lost to the Metropolitan Police club of London 40–9, a side that was described as "makeshift". Around this time, the Tuskers played their last tour in 1982, defeating Zimbabwe and Zambia. The 1980s also saw the introduction of the sevens game. However, the 1980s also saw a decline in the national side; for example, during a qualifier play-off against Zimbabwe, Kenya lost all three of their matches; by the end of the 1980s, Kenya lost to Zimbabwe 56–9.

Mixed fortunes (1990s–present) 

Kenya had firmly established stability in its domestic scene, with the game being picked up by the natives, and a league being established. During the 2000s Kenya began to start experiencing success again at the international level, finally being able to consistently record victories against sides such as Zimbabwe and Uganda.

For the 2007 Rugby World Cup qualifiers, the team defeated both Tunisia and Namibia at home, only to lose their away legs.

The team again failed to qualify for the 2011 Rugby World Cup, losing to Tunisia. In 2011, Kenya won the Africa Cup, beating Tunisia in the final 16–7 after both Morocco and Namibia withdrew due to financial constraints; the following season saw Kenya regress and struggle against Uganda and Zimbabwe, only defeating Tunisia to avoid relegation. The 2013 season proved to be a pivotal moment in Kenyan rugby, as they beat both Uganda and Zimbabwe, winning the Africa Cup for the second time, and the first time in a full four team pool.

The Simba XV were based in Cape Town for the duration of the competition and won their opening match, beating the  17–10. However, they lost their remaining six matches to finish in seventh spot in the Southern Section.

In May 2015, Kenya played a European team for the first time since the East Africa sides of the 1970s and 1980s, defeating Portugal 41–15 in a test match at the RFUEA Ground.

In 2016, the Kenya Rugby Union announced a sponsorship deal with betting firm Sportpesa, to a deal worth up to KSh.607 million/=; this is the most lucrative sponsorship deal in Kenyan rugby history, and figures not only to fund 7s and men's XVs, but the women's and youth game as well. In September of that year, the KRU formally applied to be included in the South African Currie Cup.

Record
Overall record of the Kenyan national team up to date as of 10 July 2022.

World Cup record

Africa Cup record 

 
 2000 - 2002 - Did not participate
 2003 - Pool stage
 2004 - Pool stage
 2005 - Pool stage
 2006 - Pool stage
 2007 - Third place
 2008–09 - North Trophy runners-up
 2010 - withdrew
 2011 - Champions
 2012 - Third place
 2013 - Champions
 2014 - Third place
 2015 - Third place
 2016 - Second place
 2017 - Second place
 2018 - Second place
2019-Second place
2022-Second place

Players

Current squad
Kenyan 31-man squad to compete in the 2022 Rugby World Cup Repecharge

Notable former players
Peter Munyu
Jackson Omaido
Sammy Khakame
Felix Clement Ochieng
Innocent Simiyu 
Max Muniafu
Dan Weku
Derrick Wamalwa
Oscar Osir
Benjamin Ayimba
Paul Murunga
Ted Omondi
Edward Rombo
Humphrey Kayange
Joel Nganga
Richard Nyakwaka
Martin Likami
Dennis Mwanja
David Francombe
Lucas Onyango
Joshua Chisanga
Wilson Kopondo

Simbas

The following players were included in the Simbas squad for the 2022 Currie Cup First Division:

Past coaches

Recent results

2019 Results

2018 Results

See also
 Kenya national rugby sevens team
 Kenya women's national rugby sevens team
 Kenya women's national rugby union team
Kenya Cup
Enterprise Cup
Eric Shirley Shield
Nationwide League

Notes

References

External links 

 Kenya Rugby Football Union : KRFU official website
 Rugby International
 

 
African national rugby union teams
Rugby union in Kenya